Dekala Purudu Kenek (The Strange Familiar) is a 2019 Sri Lankan film directed by Malith Hegoda and co-produced by Lal Hegoda, Malith Hegoda, Rasanga Dissanayake, Mohamed Adamaly and Nadira Adamaly for Vinode Films. The film stars Bimal Jayakodi and Samadhi Laksiri in lead roles along with Jagath Manuwarna and Prasanna Mahagamage. It is the 1324th Sri Lankan film in the Sinhala cinema.

The film has received mostly positive reviews from critics. The script will be released at the Tower Foundation Auditorium on Wijerama Mawatha, Colombo on the evening of 18 March 2020.

Plot
Dinithi tries very hard to communicate with her husband, but he ignores her presence relentlessly. The harder she tries to reach him, the deeper his silence becomes. Their 8-year-old daughter watches them. Her parents try to get involved but receive the same silent treatment from him. Dinithi doesn't work anymore. When she steps out of the house, it is only in pursuit of domestic chores, with the same taxi that has been arranged for her by her husband. That driver seems to be very friendly. Even Sanka, Dinithi's young cousin, who's staying with them seems to be overly friendly with her. One day, the husband is drawn into a road accident in which a pedestrian is killed. Dinithi rushes to his side, hoping to be of some help.

Cast
 Samadhi Laksiri as Dinithi
Bimal Jayakodi as Sachithra
 Jagath Manuwarna as Sanka
 Lakshman Mendis as Dinithi's Father
 Chamila Peiris as Dinithi's Mother
 Kaushalya Fernando as Sachithra's Mother
 Dayadewa Edirisinghe as Sachithra's Father
 Prasanna Mahagamage as Chamara
 Kushenya Sayumi Fonseka as Daughter
 Dilshani Perera as Dilrukshi as Dinithi's Sister
 Athula Pathirana as Pasindu
 Nadee Kammellaweera as Lahari
 Ananda Premalal as Baas
 Chaminda Sampath Jayaweera as Jagath
 Samanalee Fonseka as Sarini
 Ama Wijesekara as Ama
 Prasad Pereira as Prasad
 Kumuduni Wicramathanthri as Eeasha

International screening
The film has been screened worldwide with positive reviews from critics.

58th BFI London Film Festival, Dare Strand - (European Premiere), United Kingdom 2014l 
Montreal World Film Festival, Canada 2014 
Seattle South Asian Film Festival, Tasveer, USA 2015
Jogja-NETPAC Asian Film Festival, Indonesia 2015

Awards and accolades
The film has receive worldwide nominations and awards at the film festivals.

Golden Zenith Award (Nomination), First Film World Competition, Montreal World Film Festival, Canada 2014
Jury Award for the Best Debut Feature - Jaffna International Cinema Festival, Sri Lanka 2015
Golden Hanoman Award (Nomination) - Jogja-NETPAC Asian Film Festival, Indonesia 2015
Most Promising Director - Cinema of Tomorrow - Derana Film Awards 2016
Dr. Lester James Pieris Award, Sarasaviya Film Awards, 2018

References

External links
 
Dakale Purudu Kenek: on Facebook
 SOUND CHOICE!
 දැකලා පුරුදු කෙනෙක් විශේෂ දැක්ම දා
 දැකල පුරුදු කෙනෙක් ජනතා දැක්මට
දැකල පුරුදු කෙනෙක් චිත්‍රපටයේ නැති චිත්‍රපට ගීතය ඔබ හා මොහොතක්
Between domesticity and death of the bourgeois family by Dr. Prabha Manuratne
Dekala Purudu Kenek: Sealed in a box by Uditha Devapriya
Dekala Purudu Kenek: Is she real or sacred cow by Gamini Akmeemana
Strange familiar: A peek at the Lankan bourgeoisie
The strange familiar by Dilshan Boange

2010s Sinhala-language films
2014 films
2014 drama films
Sri Lankan drama films